Tatyana Yevgenyevna Khmyrova (born 6 February 1990) is a Russian handballer.

She played for the Russian national team since the younger age categories, and won the Youth World Championship in 2008. In addition, she was named the MVP of the tournament. Khmyrova made her senior debut in the same year at the 2008 European Championship, where she collected the bronze medal. In the following year at the World Championship, Tatyana was part of the gold medal winning team, and participated at the European Champiohship in 2010, finishing seventh. She competed at the 2011 World Women's Handball Championship in Brazil, where the Russian team placed 6th, and the 2012 Summer Olympics, where Russian finished 8th.

Achievements

Club
Russian Championship:
Winner: 2009, 2010, 2011
EHF Cup:
Winner: 2008

National team
World Championship:
Winner: 2009
European Championship:
Bronze Medalist: 2008
Youth World Championship:
Winner: 2008

Awards and recognition
 Most Valuable Player of the Youth World Championship: 2008

References

Living people
1990 births
Sportspeople from Volgograd
Russian female handball players
Handball players at the 2012 Summer Olympics
Expatriate handball players
Olympic handball players of Russia